Georges Aaron Bénédite (10 August 1857  26 March 1926) was a French Egyptologist and curator at the Louvre.

He was born at Nîmes, the son of Samuel Bénédite and Isabelle Bénédite born Lisbonne, whose second husband Georges Lafenestre, was a noted poet, art critic and curator of the Louvre, who helped raise the young Georges Aaron. Georges Aaron himself became a curator at the Louvre in the Department of Egyptology in 1907.

Bénédite is noted for his discovery of the Tomb of Akhethetep at Saqqara on 28 March 1903. The chapel of Akhethotep was purchased by the Louvre, in line with Egyptian policy at the time, and relocated to Paris under Bénédite's supervision. Bénédite also excavated several tombs in the Valley of the Kings, such as KV41 in 1900. He is one of the first to propose the existence of theater in ancient Egypt. 

Bénédite is also known for his purchasing of the Gebel el-Arak Knife for the Louvre from a private antique dealer M. Nahman in Cairo in February 1914. Bénédite immediately recognized the extraordinary state of preservation of the artefact as well as his archaic datation. On 16 March 1914, he writes to Charles Boreux, then head of the département des Antiquités égyptiennes of the Louvre about the knife an unsuspecting antique dealer presented him: 
{{cquote|[...] an archaic flint knife with an ivory handle of the greatest beauty. This is the masterpiece of predynastic sculpture [...] executed with remarkable finesse and elegance. This is a work of great detail [...] and the interest of what is represented is even beyond the artistic value of the artefact. On one side is a hunting scene; on the other a scene of war or raid. At the top of the hunting scene [...] the hunter wears a large Chaldean garment: the head is covered by a hat like our Gudea [...] and he grasps two lions standing against him. You can judge the importance of this asiatic representation [...] we will own one of the most important prehistoric monuments, if not more. It is, in definitive, in tangible and resumed form, the first chapter of the history of Egypt.Elisabeth Delange: Le poignard egyptien dit "du Gebel el-Arak", Musee du Louvre editions, Collection SOLO, 2009, }}

Bénédite died in Luxor, Egypt, shortly after visiting the tomb of Tutankhamun, further adding to the legend of the curse of the pharaoh. His body was brought back to France and was buried in the family vault in the cemetery of Bourg-la-Reine in the Hauts-de-Seine.

Publications
 Égypte'', Paris, Hachette, 1900, in three volumes, comprises 7 maps, 104 plans, 54 illustrations and 22 synoptic tables.

References

External links
Extensive biography, in french

French Egyptologists
Members of the Académie des Inscriptions et Belles-Lettres
People from Nîmes
1857 births
1926 deaths